The 1922 Shaw Bears football team was an American football team that represented Shaw University as a member of the Colored Intercollegiate Athletic Association (CIAA) during the 1922 college football season. Led by Henry B. Hucles in his second and final year as head coach the team compiled an overall record of 5–2–1 and a mark of 1–1 in conference play.

Schedule

References

Shaw
Shaw Bears football seasons
Shaw Bears football